Shawn Faqua (born 6 June) is a Nigerian actor, model and presenter with multiple award nominations. He is  best known for playing the role of Vincent in Lagos Cougars, as Rambo in Dare Olaitan's  Ojukokoro and Chuks in Emem Isong's Code of Silence. His performance in Lagos Cougars earned him four award nominations across Africa including Best Young/Promising Actor at the 10th Africa Movie Academy Awards. Faqua has appeared in African Magic movie's Out of the ghetto (2015), After the proposal (2015), Oasis (TV series), Red Card (2015), The Twin sword (2014), A Love like Ours (2011), Four Crooks and a Rookie (2011), Ebony Life's  A New You (2013) and others.

Faqua is a method actor and is known to successfully take on several accents as required by character he portrays. In Charles Novia's, Put a ring on it, Faqua plays the role of a single woman named Cleopatra and also doubles as the character Peter. Besides screen acting, Faqua has performed in several stage plays. He modeled for Lagos business school, Guaranty Trust Bank, First City Monument Bank, fashion shows and many other organisations. In addition to his acting work, he recorded a song for the short film, 'The good Life', performing the original sound track of the song 'I wan blow'.

Career 
Faqua studied at the University of Port-harcourt where he obtained a degree in electrical engineering. He began modeling for billboards and also several anchored shows along with stage acting, directing, modeling, choreography and singing.

In 2012, Faqua obtained a Certificate in Acting from the Nollywood Upgrade Training in affiliation with the Center for Digital Imaging Arts at Boston University. In 2014, he transitioned from his Engineering career to a full-time acting career.

Personal life 
Faqua takes on roles that are dramatic, challenging, cheesy, intense and comical. Many of the productions he has been featured in address salient issues that border on love, politics, culture, human rights, conflict, rape, betrayal, selfless service and sacrifice. He has been known to repeatedly research each character he takes on and pays attention to details (language, pronunciation, style and other nuances associated with the character he's portraying), as he always wants to tell a compelling and believable story. Shawn enjoys reading, dancing, playing tennis, traveling and watching movies. He currently resides in the city of Lagos, Nigeria.

Charity 
Faqua has been a celebrity supporter of the Nigeria Red Cross. He had become involved with charity in 2004 and was part of the Excos of the Youth Against HIV and Aids in collaboration with the then First Lady of the Federal Republic of Nigeria Stella Obasanjo  and the NUGA games whose primary focus was to enlighten the youths on voluntary counselling Testing (VCT) for HIV aids.  Shawn was also the president of the Youth Against Drug Abuse and Child Trafficking (YAWAT) in Abuja, Nigeria. In 2016, he partnered with the Nigerian Army for the Fallen heroes projects as he played lead in the short film 'Separated' in  support of all fallen heroes and their loved ones. Since then Faqua has made several appearances showing support for charities and disaster relief.

Other works 
Shawn has been featured on talk shows such as Heart of the matter where he speaks on 'Real Fatherhood and Manhood', Twitchat with Blecyn and Tribe stories among others. He has anchored shows like Urban Royale's Magazine Launch and Retro 52 an Independence Event where he was a Co-host and Presenter. He is passionate about engaging the youths, assisting the children on the streets with no positive role model in their life influencing by systematic penetration through entertainment.

Selected filmography

Awards and nominations

See also
 List of Nigerian actors

References 

Living people
Nigerian male film actors
Year of birth missing (living people)
University of Port Harcourt alumni
Nigerian male models
Nigerian television presenters